Somoy Television is a Bangladeshi Bengali-language satellite and cable 24-hour Bengali television channel, headquartered at 89, Bir Uttam CR Dutta Road, Banglamotor, Dhaka. It has a broadcast NOC license from the government of the People's Republic of Bangladesh. After a test transmission on 10 October 2010, it has been commercially on-air since 17 April 2011. The channel is transmitted using satellite Bangabandhu-1, the first satellite of Bangladesh, operated by Bangladesh Communication Satellite Company Limited. The channel is owned by Somoy Media Limited, a subsidiary of the City Group. It holds the distinction of being the most subscribed Bangladeshi YouTube channel, the first YouTube channel to get the Diamond Play Button.

History
Somoy TV received government permission for broadcasting in October 2009. It started a test transmission on 10 October 2010 and has been commercially on-air since 17 April 2011. Before its official launch, Somoy TV was sold to City Group on 8 June 2010. In November 2011, Somoy TV, along with three other Bangladeshi television channels, signed an agreement with UNICEF to air children's programming for one minute.

On 1 January 2014, unidentified individuals threw bombs on an official vehicle of Somoy TV, injuring the driver, in Chittagong City. Journalists at the network blamed activists of Bangladesh Jamaat-e-Islami and Islami Chhatra Shibir.

On 1 April 2015, Bangladesh Police seized transmission equipment of Somoy TV outside the office of former Prime Minister and Chairperson of Bangladesh Nationalist Party, Khaleda Zia.

In May 2016, drug dealers assaulted the Somoy TV Cox's Bazar District correspondent, Sujauddin Rubel, for his reports on drug trafficking.

In September 2016, Attorney General of Bangladesh, Mahbubey Alam, filled a complaint with the Bangladesh Supreme Court over comments on a TV show that discussed the war crimes trial of Mir Quasem Ali. Somoy TV was forced to submit transcripts of the show to the court.

On 30 November 2017, the son of the Minister of Land, Shamsur Rahman Sherif, attacked and injured four journalists including one of Somoy TV. On 19 May 2019, Somoy TV, along with five other channels, began broadcasting via the Bangabandhu-1 satellite after signing an agreement with BSCL.

The official YouTube channel of Somoy TV was hacked by unknown hackers on 16 October 2022, subsequently being renamed to 'Ethereum 2.0', after the Ethereum cryptocurrency. The channel was reverted back to its original form ten minutes after the hacking incident, but its name was not reverted until later.

See also
 List of television stations in Bangladesh

References

External links 
 Official website

Television channels in Bangladesh
Television channels and stations established in 2010
24-hour television news channels in Bangladesh
2010 establishments in Bangladesh